Jarkko Samuli Ruutu; born August 23, 1975) is a Finnish former professional ice hockey forward who played in the National Hockey League (NHL) with the Vancouver Canucks, Pittsburgh Penguins, Ottawa Senators and Anaheim Ducks. He is currently serving as a European development coach for the Columbus Blue Jackets.

Playing career 

Ruutu initially moved to North America to play college hockey with Michigan Tech of the Western Collegiate Hockey Association (WCHA). However, after his first year, he returned to Finland and turned professional with HIFK of the SM-liiga in 1996–97. In his draft year, he recorded 20 points in 37 games and was then drafted by the Vancouver Canucks in the third round, 68th overall, in the 1998 NHL Entry Draft. He played one more season with HIFK before moving back to North America to play for the Canucks' American Hockey League (AHL) affiliate at the time, the Syracuse Crunch.

Ruutu played his first full season with the Canucks in 2001–02 and earned himself a reputation as one of the NHL's most effective "pests" or "agitators". During the 2004–05 NHL lockout, he returned to play for HIFK and set a SM-liiga record for penalty minutes in a single season with 215 (since broken by Matt Nickerson).

Ruutu had his best NHL season to date statistically in the 2005–06 season, scoring 10 goals and 7 assists for 17 points in 82 games, while amassing 142 penalty minutes with the Canucks. In the off-season, Ruutu became a free agent on July 1, 2006, and signed with the Pittsburgh Penguins. He recorded his first three-point game in NHL during his second season with the Penguins on March 27, 2008, against the New York Islanders.

In July 2008, Ruutu signed with the Ottawa Senators to a three-year, $3.9 million contract. On November 13, 2008, he was suspended two games for elbowing Maxim Lapierre in the head two days earlier in a game against the Montreal Canadiens.

In a game on January 6, 2009, Ruutu allegedly bit the gloved thumb of Buffalo Sabres' enforcer Andrew Peters during a first-period altercation, although he denied this in a post-game interview and claimed Peters had actually gouged his eye and stuck his fingers into Ruutu's mouth. The next day, he was suspended for two games and fined $31,700 by the NHL for the incident.

On February 17, 2011, Ruutu was traded to the Anaheim Ducks in exchange for a sixth-round draft pick in 2011. In his final season in the NHL, Ruutu played out remainder of his contract with the Ducks, appearing in 23 games for a goal and assist.

After his NHL career, Ruutu returned to the SM-Liiga to play for Jokerit on a three-year contract. His contract was not renewed after Jokerit left SM-Liiga to join the Kontinental Hockey League (KHL) in 2014. He completed his professional career playing four games with EHC Biel in the Swiss National League A (NLA) during the 2014–15 season before announcing his retirement as a player on December 15, 2014.

International play

Ruutu has appeared in six World Championships with Finland and has won silver medals in 1998, 2001 and 2007 and a bronze medal in 2006.

At the 2004 World Cup, Ruutu helped Finland to a second-place finish, losing the championship game to Canada.

Ruutu also won a silver medal with Finland at the 2006 Winter Olympics in Turin. He gained notoriety during the tournament when he checked Czech winger Jaromír Jágr to the boards while Jágr was crouching.

Personal
Ruutu is married to Sofia Ruutu (née Morelius), a Finnish model and blogger. The couple have two children and live in Töölö, Helsinki. His younger brother, Tuomo Ruutu, also played in the NHL, appearing in more than 700 games, and was mostly recently active with HC Davos in the Swiss NLA. His other brother, retired player Mikko Ruutu, is currently a scout for the Ottawa Senators. Jarkko Ruutu is also a second cousin of Hanno Möttölä, who became the first Finnish basketball player to play in the National Basketball Association (NBA). Ruutu's cousin, Raul Ruutu, plays bass in Finnish pop rock band Sunrise Avenue.

Career statistics

Regular season and playoffs

International

Transactions 
 Signed as a free agent by HIFK Helsinki (Finland), September 23, 2004.
 Signed as a free agent by Pittsburgh Penguins, July 4, 2006.
 Signed as a free agent by Ottawa Senators, July 2, 2008.
 Traded by the Ottawa Senators to the Anaheim Ducks, February 17, 2011
 Signed as a free agent by Jokerit, September 9, 2011

See also 
 Notable families in the NHL
List of Olympic medalist families

References

External links 
 

1975 births
Living people
Anaheim Ducks players
EHC Biel players
Columbus Blue Jackets coaches
Columbus Blue Jackets scouts
Finnish ice hockey right wingers
HIFK (ice hockey) players
Ice hockey players at the 2002 Winter Olympics
Ice hockey players at the 2006 Winter Olympics
Ice hockey players at the 2010 Winter Olympics
Jokerit players
Kansas City Blades players
Medalists at the 2006 Winter Olympics
Medalists at the 2010 Winter Olympics
Michigan Tech Huskies men's ice hockey players
Olympic bronze medalists for Finland
Olympic ice hockey players of Finland
Olympic medalists in ice hockey
Olympic silver medalists for Finland
Ottawa Senators players
Sportspeople from Vantaa
Pittsburgh Penguins players
Vancouver Canucks draft picks
Vancouver Canucks players